This is a list of visual artists who are Indigenous peoples of the Americas, categorized by primary media. Mestizo and Métis artists whose indigenous descent is integral to their art are included, as are Siberian Yup'ik artists due to their cultural commonalities with Alaskan Yup'ik people. This list includes notable visual artists who are Inuit, Alaskan Natives, Siberian Yup'ik, American Indians, First Nations, Métis, Mestizos, and Indigenous peoples of Mexico, the Caribbean, Central America, and South America. Indigenous identity is a complex and contested issue and differs from country to country in the Americas. Inclusion to this list is based on legal membership to an Indigenous community, when applicable, or recognition by the relevant indigenous community/communities of the individual as a member of that community.

Basket makers

 Elsie Allen, Cloverdale Pomo, 1899–1990
 Annie Antone, Tohono O'odham
 Carrie Bethel, Mono Lake Paiute, 1898–1974
 Mary Holiday Black, Navajo, c. 1934–2022
 Loren Bommelyn, Smith River Tolowa
 Nellie Charlie, Mono Lake Paiute, 1867–1965
 Kelly Church, Potawatomi/Odawa-Ojibwe
 Delores Churchill, Haida
 Mike Dart, Cherokee Nation, born 1977
 Florence Davidson, Haida, Canada, 1896–1993
 Mavis Doering, Cherokee Nation, 1929–2007
 Joe Feddersen, Colville, born 1953
 Iva Honyestewa, Hopi/Navajo
 Terrol Dew Johnson, Tohono O'odham
 Yvonne Walker Keshick, Anishinaabe born 1946
 Louisa Keyser (Datsolalee), Washoe, c. 1829/1850–1925
 Kikisoblu (Princess Angeline), Lushootseed, c. 1820–1896
 Mabel McKay, Pomo/Patwin, 1907–1993
 Geo Soctomah Neptune, Passamaquoddy
 Essie Parrish, Kashaya Pomo, 1902–1979
 Christine Navarro Paul, Chitimacha, 1874-1946 
 Boeda Strand, Snohomish
 Lucy Telles, Mono Lake Paiute/Yosemite Miwok, c. 1885–1955
 Gail Tremblay, Mi'kmaq/Onondaga descent
 Dawn Nichols Walden, Mackinac Bands of Chippewa and Ottawa Indians, born 1949

Beadwork and quillwork artists

 Tahnee Ahtoneharjo-Growingthunder, Kiowa/Muscogee/Seminole
 Richard Aitson, Kiowa/Kiowa Apache, born 1953
 Marcus Amerman, Choctaw Nation of Oklahoma
 Imogene Goodshot Arquero, beadwork artist
 Martha Berry, Cherokee Nation
 Chipeta, Kiowa Apache, 1843/4–1924
 Juanita Growing Thunder Fogarty, Fort Peck Assiniboine and Sioux, born 1969
 Teri Greeves, Kiowa, born 1970
 Carla Hemlock, Mohawk
 Vanessa Paukeigope Jennings, Kiowa/Kiowa Apache/Gila River Pima, born 1952
 Maude Kegg, Ojibwe, 1904–1986
 Yvonne Walker Keshick, Grand Traverse Ottawa-Ojibwe, born 1946
 Katrina Mitten, Miami Tribe of Oklahoma beadwork artist
 Emily Waheneka, Warm Springs/Wasco/Northern Paiute, 1919–2008

Ceramic artists

 Aguilar Family, Santo Domingo Pueblo
 Mrs. Ramos Aguilar, Santo Domingo Pueblo
 Tammie Allen, Jicarilla Apache
 Asuncion Aguilar Cate, Santo Domingo Pueblo
 Crucita Gonzales Calabaza (Blue Corn), San Ildefonso Pueblo
 Marie Chino, Acoma
 Vera Chino, Acoma
 Deborah Clashin, Hopi-Tewa, born 1928
 Helen Quintana Cordero, Cochiti Pueblo, 1915–1994
 Arthur and Hilda Coriz, Santo Domingo Pueblo
 Juanita Suazo Dubray, Taos Pueblo
 Anthony Durand, Picuris Pueblo
 Felipita Aguilar Garcia, Santo Domingo Pueblo
 Tammy Garcia, Santa Clara Pueblo, born 1969
 Bill Glass Jr., Cherokee Nation
 Rose Gonzales, Ohkay Owingeh
 Margaret and Luther Gutierrez, Santa Clara Pueblo
 Michael Kanteena, Laguna Pueblo
 Lucy M. Lewis, Acoma Pueblo
 Joseph Lonewolf, Santa Clara Pueblo
 Julian Martinez, San Ildefonso Pueblo
 Maria Montoya Martinez (Poveka), San Ildefonso Pueblo
 Helen Naha, Hopi
 Tyra Naha, Hopi, granddaughter of Helen Naha
 Nampeyo, Hopi-Tewa, c. 1859–1942
 Elva Nampeyo, Hopi
 Fannie Nampeyo, Hopi
 Dextra Nampeyo Quotskuyva, Hopi-Tewa
 Nora Naranjo-Morse, Santa Clara Pueblo
 Garnet Pavatea, Hopi-Tewa, (1915–1981)
 Al Qöyawayma, Hopi
 Jeri Redcorn, Caddo/Potawatomi, born c. 1940
 Diego Romero, Cochiti Pueblo
 Linda Sisneros, Santa Clara Pueblo
 Merton Sisneros, Santa Clara Pueblo
 Anita Suazo, Santa Clara Pueblo
 Roxanne Swentzell, Santa Clara Pueblo
 Margaret Tafoya, Santa Clara Pueblo, 1904–2001
 Leonidas Tapia, Ohkay Owingeh
 Faye Tso, Navajo, 1933–2004
 Nathan Youngblood, Santa Clara Pueblo

Diverse cultural artists

 David Moses Bridges (Passamaquoddy, 1962–2017), birchbark artist, canoe maker
 William Commanda, Anishinaabe, Canada, born 1913, canoe maker
 Nora Thompson Dean (Touching Leaves Woman), Delaware Tribe of Indians, 1907–1984
 Ishi, Yahi (ca. 1860-1916), bowmaker and flintknapper
 Vanessa Paukeigope Jennings, Kiowa/Apache/Pima, born 1952
 Tomah Joseph (Passamaquoddy, 1837–1914), birchbark artist, canoe maker
 Hawk Littlejohn, Eastern Band Cherokee, 1941–2000, flute maker
 Charles Littleleaf, Blackfoot/Warm Springs, flute maker
 Tom Mauchahty-Ware, Kiowa/Comanche, 1946–2015, flute maker
 Angelique Merasty, Woodland Cree, 1924–1996, birchbark biter
 Scarface Charley, Modoc, c. 1851–1896
 Hastings Shade, Cherokee Nation, 1941–2010, antler carver, marble- and gig-maker
 Tommy Wildcat, Cherokee Nation/Natchez, flute and rattle maker, born 1967

Draftspeople

Artists who primarily work in drawing, including pastels.

 Kenojuak Ashevak, Inuk, born 1927
 Pitseolak Ashoona, Inuk, 1904/1907–1983
 Roy Boney, Jr., Cherokee Nation, born 1978
 Chafil Cheucarama, Wounaan, Panama
 Felipe Guaman Poma de Ayala, Quechua, c. 1535–after 1616
 Aka Høegh, Greenlandic Inuk, born 1947
 Tivi Etok, Inuk, born 1929
 Alootook Ipellie, Inuk, 1951–2007
 Helen Kalvak, Copper Inuit, 1901–1983
 Siassie Kenneally, Inuk, 1969–2018
 Daphne Odjig, Odawa-Potawatomi, born 1919
 Ulayu Pingwartok, Inuk, 1904–1978
 Tim Pitsiulak, Inuk, 1967–2016
 Annie Pootoogook, Inuk, born 1969
 Napachie Pootoogook, Inuk, 1938–2002
 Mary Pudlat, Inuk, 1923–2001
 Pudlo Pudlat, Inuk, 1916–1992
 Moses Stranger Horse, Brulé Lakota, 1890–1941
 Pablo Tac, Luiseño, 1822–1841
 Irene Avaalaaqiaq Tiktaalaaq, Inuk, born 1941
 Francisco Toledo, Zapotec, Mexico, born 1940
 Kakulu Saggiaktok, Inuk, 1940–2020
 Nicotye Samayualie, Inuk, born 1983
 Shanawdithit, Beothuk, Canada, c. 1801–1829
 Angotigolu Teevee, Inuk, 1910–1967
 Ningiukulu Teevee, Inuk, born 1963
 Simon Tookoome, Inuk, 1934–2010
 Elizabeth Woody, Navajo-Tenino (Warm Springs)-Wasco-Yakama, born 1959
 Michael Nicoll Yahgulanaas, Haida, Canada, born 1954

Glass artists
 Marcus Amerman, Choctaw, born 1959
 Joe Feddersen, Colville, born 1953
 Marianne Nicolson, PhD, Dzawada’enuxw, born 1969
 Preston Singletary, Tlingit, born 1963

Installation artists

 Natalie Ball, Klamath/Modoc, born 1980
 Rebecca Belmore, Ojibway, Canada, born 1960
 Raven Chacon, Navajo Nation, born 1977
 Corky Clairmont, Salish-Kootenai, born 1946
 Gerald Clarke, Cahuilla, born 1967
 Lorenzo Clayton, Navajo, born 1950
 Bonnie Devine, Serpent River First Nation
 Greg A. Hill, Kanyen'kehaka Mohawk, Canada
 Brian Jungen, Danezaa, Canada, born 1970
 Truman Lowe, Ho-Chunk, 1940–2019
 Cannupa Hanska Luger, Mandan/Hidatsa/Arikara/Lakota, born 1979
 James Luna, Luiseño, 1950–2018
 Nora Naranjo Morse, Santa Clara Pueblo, born 1953
 Marianne Nicolson, Dzawada’enuxw, Canada, born 1969
 Charlene Teters, Spokane, born 1952
 Marie Watt, Seneca Nation, born 1967
 Richard Ray Whitman, Yuchi/Muscogee, born 1949
 Holly Wilson (Delaware Nation/Cherokee, born 1968)

Metalsmiths and jewelers

 Atsidi Sani, "Old Smith", Navajo, c. 1828–1918
 Klee Benally, Navajo, born October 1975
 Gail Bird, Kewa Pueblo-Laguna Pueblo
 Ben Nighthorse Campbell, Cheyenne, born 1933
 Charles Edenshaw, Haida, Canada, 1839–1920
 Michael Horse, Yaqui-Mescalero Apache-Zuni-descent, born 1951
 Yazzie Johnson, Navajo
 Michael Kabotie, Hopi, 1942–2009
 Charles Loloma, Hopi, 1921–1991
 Bill Reid, Haida, Canada, 1920–1998
 Emory Sekaquaptewa, Hopi, 1928–2007
 Phillip Sekaquaptewa, Hopi, born 1956
 Sequoyah, Cherokee, c. 1767–1843
 Jay Simeon, Haida, Canada, born 1976
 Tommy Singer, Navajo, born 1940

New media artists

 Natalie Ball, Klamath/Modoc, born 1980
 Nicholas Galanin, Tlingit Aleut, born 1979
 Rosemary Georgeson, Coast Salish and Sahtu Dene multimedia artist

Mixed-media artists 
 Melissa Melero-Moose (Northern Paiute/Modoc) mixed-media artist, curator

Painters

Canada and Greenland

 Aron of Kangeq, Kalaallit, Greenland, 1822–1869
 Carl Beam, M'Chigeeng First Nation Ojibwe 1943–2005
 Jackson Beardy, Ayisini, 1944–1984
 Robert Boyer, Métis-Cree, 1948–2004
 Benjamin Chee Chee, Ojibwe, 1944–1977
 Thue Christiansen, Greenlandic Inuk, Greenland, born 1940
 George Clutesi, Tseshaht First Nation, 1905–1988
 Eddy Cobiness, Ojibwe, 1933–1996
 Joseph Tehawehron David, Mohawk, 1957–2004
 Delree Dumont, Onion Lake Cree Nation
 Robert Houle, Saulteaux, born 1947
 Tom Hogan, Ojibwe, 1955–2014
 Alex Janvier, Dene Suline-Saulteaux, born 1935
 Abe Kakepetum, Sandy Lake First Nation
 Henrik Lund, Greenlandic Inuk, Greenland, 1875–1948
 Gerald McMaster, Plains Cree-Siksika First Nation, born 1953
 Kent Monkman, Cree, born 1965
 Norval Morrisseau, Ojibwa, 1932–2007
 David Neel, Kwakwaka'wakw, born 1960
 Maxine Noel, Santee-Oglala Lakota, born 1946
 Daphne Odjig, Odawa/Potawatomi, born 1919
 Carl Ray, Sandy Lake First Nation, 1943–1978
 Rick Rivet, Sahtu/Métis, born 1949
 Allen Sapp, Cree, born 1928
 David B. Williams, Ojibway, died 2009
 Alfred Young Man, Plains Cree

United States

 Arthur Amiotte, Oglala Lakota (born 1942)
 Spencer Asah, Kiowa, one of the Kiowa Six (c. 1905–1954)
 James Auchiah, Kiowa, one of the Kiowa Six (1906–1974)
 Alexandra Backford, Aleut, (1942–2010)
 Amos Bad Heart Bull, Oglala Lakota (1869–1913)
 Louis Ballard (Honga-no-zhe), Quapaw/Cherokee
 Rick Bartow, Yurok/Mad River Wiyot, (born 1946)
 Fred Beaver (Eka La Nee), Muscogee Creek/Seminole, (1911–1980)
 Harrison Begay (Haskay Yahne Yah), Navajo, (born 1914)
 Archie Blackowl (Mistamootova), Southern Cheyenne, (1911–1992)
 Acee Blue Eagle (Alexander C. McIntosh), Creek, (ca. 1909–1959)
 T.C. Cannon (Pai-doung-u-day), Kiowa/Caddo (1946–1978)
 Pop Chalee (Merina Lujan), Taos Pueblo (1908–1993)
 Jesse Cornplanter, Seneca Nation (1889–1957)
 Woody Crumbo, Potawatomi (1912–1989)
 David Cusick, Tuscarora (c. 1786–1831)
 Dennis Cusick, Tuscarora (c. 1800–1824)
 Talmadge Davis, Cherokee Nation (1962–2005)
 Gregg Deal, Pyramid Lake Paiute Tribe (born 1975)
 Angel De Cora (Hinook-Mahiwi-Kilinaka), Winnebago (1871–1919)
 Patrick DesJarlait, Red Lake Ojibwe (1923–1973)
 Cecil Dick, Cherokee (1915–1992)
 Bunky Echo–Hawk, Yakama/Pawnee (born 1975)
 Joseph Erb, Cherokee Nation, (born 1974)
 Harry Fonseca, Maidu (1946–2006)
 Jeffrey Gibson, Mississippi Choctaw/Cherokee (born 1972)
 R.C. Gorman, Navajo (1932–2005)
 Enoch Kelly Haney, Seminole (born 1940)
 Helen Hardin (Tsa-Sah-Wee-Eh), Santa Clara Pueblo (1943–1984)
 Albert Harjo, Muscogee Creek (1937–2019)
 Benjamin Harjo, Jr., Absentee Shawnee/Seminole
 Sharron Ahtone Harjo, Kiowa (born 1945)
 Hachivi Edgar Heap of Birds, Cheyenne-Arapaho Tribes (born 1954)
 Joan Hill, Muscogee (Creek) Nation/Cherokee (born 1930)
 Jack Hokeah, Kiowa, one of the Kiowa Six, (1902–1969)
 Norma Howard, Choctaw/Chickasaw
 Oscar Howe (Mazuha Hokshina), Yanktonai (1915–1983)
 Howling Wolf, Southern Cheyenne (1849–1927)
 Sharon Irla, Cherokee Nation (born 1957)
 David Johns (Navajo Nation) (born 1948)
 Ruthe Blalock Jones (Shawnee/Peoria) (born 1939)
 Fred Kabotie (Naqavoy'ma), Hopi (1900–1986)
 Michael Kabotie, Hopi
 Lois Smoky Kaulaity, Bougetah, Kiowa, one of the Kiowa Six (1907–1981)
 Albert Looking Elk, Taos Pueblo (c. 1888–1940)
 Albert Lujan, Taos Pueblo (1892–1948)
 Julian Martinez, San Ildefonso Pueblo (1897–1943)
 Mario Martinez, Yaqui (born 1953)
 Barbara McAlister, Cherokee Nation (born 1941)
 Alex Meraz, Purépecha (born 1985)
 America Meredith, Cherokee Nation (born 1972)
 Douglas Miles, San Carlos Apache/Akimel O'odham (born c. 1962)
 Juan Mirabal, Taos Pueblo (1903–1970)
 Stephen Mopope (Qued Koi), Kiowa, one of the Kiowa Six (1898–1974)
 George Morrison, Grand Portage Ojibwe, (1919–2000)
 Naiche, Chiricahua Apache, (c. 1857–1919)
 Gerald Nailor, Sr. (Toh Yah), Navajo (1917–1952)
 Dan Namingha, Hopi
 Jackson Narcomey, Muscogee Creek Nation/Seminole, (1942–2012)
 Doc Tate Nevaquaya (Comanche Nation, 1932–1996)
 Lloyd Kiva New (Cherokee Nation, 1916–2002)
 Diane O'Leary, Comanche (1939–2013)
 Tonita Peña, San Ildefonso (1893–1949)
 St. David Pendleton Oakerhater (Making Medicine), Southern Cheyenne (c. 1847–1931)
 Otis Polelonema (Lomadamocvia), Hopi (1902–1981)
 Sanford Plummer (Ga-yo-gwa-doke), Seneca Nation (1905–1974)
 Harvey Pratt, Cheyenne-Arapaho Tribes
 Kevin Red Star, Crow Nation
 Mateo Romero, Cochiti Pueblo (born 1966)
 Paladine Roye, Ponca,(1946–2001)
 Will Sampson, Muscogee Creek (1933–1977)
 Fritz Scholder, Luiseño (1933–2005)
 Ernest Smith, Seneca Nation (1907-1975) 
 Jaune Quick-To-See Smith, Salish-Kootenai, Métis-Cree, Shoshone-Bannock
 Ernest Spybuck, Absentee Shawnee (1883–1949)
 Moses Stranger Horse, Sicangu Lakota (1890–1941)
 Virginia Stroud, United Keetoowah Band Cherokee/Muscogee Creek (born 1951)
 Carl Sweezy, Southern Arapaho (1881–1953)
 Quincy Tahoma, Navajo (1920–1956)
 Jerome Tiger, Muscogee Creek/Seminole (1941–1967) 
 Johnny Tiger, Jr., Muscogee Creek-Seminole (!940–2015)
 Tohausen, Kiowa (c. 1785–1866)
 Monroe Tsatoke, Kiowa, one of the Kiowa Six (1904–1937)
 Klah Tso, Navajo, (mid-19th–early 20th century)
 Pablita Velarde (Tse Tsan), Santa Clara Pueblo, (1918–2006)
 Kay WalkingStick, Cherokee Nation
 Walter Richard West Sr., Dick West, Southern Cheyenne (1912–1996)
 Dyani White Hawk, Sicangu Lakota (born 1976)
 White Horse, Kiowa (died 1892)
 Emmi Whitehorse, Navajo

Mexico

Fernando de Alva Cortés Ixtlilxochitl, Texcocan, (1568/1580–1648)
Miguel Cabrera, Zapotec, (1695–1768)
Jesús Guerrero Galván, Nahua, (1910–1973)
Frida Kahlo, Purépecha-descent, (1907–1954)
María Izquierdo, San Juan de los Lagos, Jalisco, (1902–1955)
Rodolfo Morales, Zapotec, (1925–2001)
Diego Rivera, Mestizo from mother's side, (1886–1957)
Rufino Tamayo, Zapotec, (1899–1991)

Central America and the Caribbean
 Pen Cayetano, Garifuna, Belize
 Chafil Cheucarama, Wounaan, Panama
 Andrés Curruchich, Kaqchikel Maya, (1891–1969)
 Luis Rolando Ixquiac Xicara, Maya, Guatemala, (born 1947)
 Aníbal López, Maya, Guatemala, (born 1964)
 Carlos Mérida, K'iche' Maya-Zapotec, Guatemala, (1891–1984)

South America

 Camilo Egas, Mestizo, Ecuador, (1889–1962)
 Oswaldo Guayasamín, Quechua, Ecuador, (1919–1999)
 Antonio Sinchi Roca Inka, Quechua, Peru, (17th century)
 Eduardo Kingman, Mestizo, Ecuador, (1913–1998)
 Carlos Jacanamijoy, Inga, Colombia, (born 1964)
 Roberto Mamani Mamani, Aymara, Bolivia, (born 1962)
 Diego Quispe Tito, Quechua, Peru, (1611–1681)
 Basilio Santa Cruz Pumacallao, Quechua, Peru, (17th century)
 George Simon, Lokono Arawak, Guyana, (born 1947)
 Alejandro Mario Yllanes, Aymara, Bolivia, (1913–1960)
 Marcos Zapata, Quechua, Peru, (c. 1710–1773)

Performance artists

 Natalie Ball, Klamath/Modoc, (born 1980)
 Marcus Amerman, Choctaw, (born 1959)
 Rebecca Belmore, Anishinaabe, Canada, (born 1960)
 Gregg Deal, Pyramid Lake Paiute Tribe, (born 1975)
 Aníbal López, Maya, Guatemala, (born 1964)
 James Luna, Luiseño, (born 1950)
 Kent Monkman, Cree, Canada, (born 1965)
 Mujeres Creando, Mestiza, Bolivia

Photographers

 Dugan Aguilar, Paiute-Achomawi-Maidu (1947–2018)
 Martín Chambi, Quechua, Peru (1891–1973)
 Jennie Ross Cobb, Cherokee (1881–1959)
 Jean Fredericks, Hopi (1906–1990)
 Luis González Palma, Mestizo, Guatemala (born 1957)
 Shan Goshorn, Eastern Band Cherokee (1957–2018)
 Benjamin Haldane, Tsimshian (1874–1941)
 Sally Larsen, Apache-Alutiiq
 L. Frank Manriquez, Tongva-Acjachemen
 Lee Marmon, Laguna Pueblo (1925–2021)
 Parker McKenzie, Kiowa (1897–1999)
 Larry McNeil, Tlingit-Nisga'a (born 1955)
 David Neel, Kwakwaka'wakw (born 1960)
 Shelley Niro, Mohawk (born 1954)
 Peter Pitseolak, Inuk (1902–1973)
 Horace Poolaw, Kiowa (1906–1984)
 Arthur Renwick, Haisla (born 1965)
 Richard Throssel, Cree (1882–1933)
 Hulleah Tsinhnahjinnie, Muscogee Creek-Seminole-Navajo (born 1954)
 Richard Ray Whitman, Yuchi-Muscogee Creek (born 1949)
 Matika Wilbur, founder of Project 562, Swinomish-Tulalip (born 1984)
 Will Wilson, Navajo (born 1969)

Printmakers

 Germaine Arnaktauyok, Inuk, (born 1946)
 Kenojuak Ashevak, Inuk, (born 1927)
 Siasi Atitu, Inuk, (c.1896–1983)
 T.C. Cannon (Pai-doung-u-day), Kiowa-Caddo-Choctaw
 Corky Clairmont, Salish-Kootenai, (born 1946)
 Santos Chávez, Mapuche, Chile, (1934–2001)
 Lorenzo Clayton, Navajo, (born 1950)
 Joe David, Nuu-chah-nulth, (born 1946)
 Tivi Etok, Inuk, (born 1929)
 Joe Feddersen, Colville, (born 1953)
 R.C. Gorman, Navajo, (1932–2005)
 Benjamin Harjo Jr., Shawnee-Seminole
 Hachivi Edgar Heap of Birds, Cheyenne-Arapaho
 Debora Iyall, Cowlitz, (born 1954)
 Kiakshuk, Inuk, (1886–1966)
 Iyola Kingwatsiak, Inuk, (1933–2000)
 Terran Last Gun, Piikani Blackfoot, (born 1989)
 James Lavadour, Walla Walla
 Linda Lomahaftewa, Hopi-Choctaw, (born 1947)
 Kavavaow Mannomee, Inuk, (born 1958)
 America Meredith, Cherokee Nation, (born 1972)
 Carlos Mérida, K'iche' Maya, (1891–1984)
 Ohotaq Mikkigak, Inuk, (1936–2014)
 Kellypalik Mungitok, Inuk, (born 1940)
 Jessie Oonark, Inuk, (1906–1985)
 Josie Pamiutu Papialuk, Inuk, (1918–1996)
 Parr, Inuk, (1893–1969)
 Sheouak Petaulassie, Inuk, (1918 or 1923–1961)
 David Ruben Piqtoukun, Inuk, (born 1950)
 Eegyvudluk Pootoogook, Inuk, (1931–2000)
 Sharni Pootoogook, Inuk, (1922–2003)
 Kananginak Pootoogook, Inuk, (born 1935)
 Jay Simeon, Haida, Canada, (born 1976)
 Jaune Quick-To-See Smith, Salish-Kootenai, Métis-Cree, Shoshone-Bannock
 Joe Talirunili, Inuk, Canada, (c. 1893–1976)
 Angotigolu Teevee, Inuk, (1910–1967)
 Jamasie Teevee, Inuk, (1910–1985)
 Ikayukta Tunnillie, Inuk, (1911–1980)
 Arthur Vickers, Tsimshian-Heiltsuk, Canada, (born 1947)
 Roy Henry Vickers, Tsimshian-Haida-Heiltsuk, (born 1946)
 Tania Willard, Secwepemc nation
 Nathaniel P. Wilkerson, Gitxsan, (born 1972)
 Melanie Yazzie, Navajo, (born 1966)
 Alejandro Mario Yllanes, Aymara, Bolivia, (1913–1960)

Sculptors
Artists primarily working in antler, bone, metal, stone, and other materials, except wood. Sculptors working primarily in wood are listed below.

 Latcholassie Akesuk, Inuk, (1919–2000)
 Isa Paddy Aqiattusuk, Inuk, (1898–1954)
 Kiugak Ashoona, Inuk, (1933–2014)
 Blackbear Bosin, Kiowa/Comanche, (1921–1980)
 Thue Christiansen Greenlandic Inuk, (born 1940)
 Gerald Clarke, Cahuilla, (born 1967)
 Lorenzo Clayton, Navajo, (born 1950)
 Ennutsiak, Inuk, (1896–1967)
 Lucassie Etungat, Inuk, (1951–?)
 Joe Feddersen, Colville Okanagan-Sinixt, (born 1953)
 Cliff Fragua, Jemez Pueblo
 Tammy Garcia, Santa Clara Pueblo, (born 1969)
 Jeffrey Gibson, Mississippi Choctaw/Cherokee, (born 1972)
 Aka Høegh, Greenlandic Inuk, (born 1947)
 Allan Houser (Haozous), Chiricahua Apache (1914–1994)
 Bob Haozous, Chiricahua Apache, (born 1943)
 Iola Abraham Ikkidluak, Inuk, (1936–2003)
 Tivi Ilisituk, Inuk, (born 1933)
 Charlie Inukpuk, Inuk, (born 1941)
 Osuitok Ipeelee, Inuk, (1922–2005)
 Davidee Itulu, Inuk, (1929–2006)
 Kiakshuk, Inuk, (1886–1966)
 Davidee Kavik, Inuk, (born 1915)
 Floyd Kuptana, Inuk, (born 1964)
 Truman Lowe, Ho-chunk, (1940–2019)
 Edmonia Lewis, Mississauga Ojibwe, (c. 1844–1907)
 Enook Manomie, Inuk, (1941–2006)
 Andy Miki, Inuk, (1918–1983)
 Nora Naranjo Morse, Santa Clara Pueblo (born 1953)
 Adamie Niviaxie, Inuk, (borm 1925)
 Maudie Rachel Okittuq, Inuk, (born 1944)
 John Pangnark, Inuk, (1920–1980)
 David Ruben Piqtoukun, Inuk, (born 1950)
 Harvey Pratt, Cheyenne-Arapaho Tribes (born 1941)
 Lawney Reyes, Sinixt
 Pauta Saila, Inuk, (c.1916–2009)
 Ronald Senungetuk, Iñupiaq, (1933–2020)
 Aqjangajuk Shaa, Inuk, (1937–2019)
 Nick Sikkuark, Inuk, (1943–2013)
 Charlie Sivuarapik, Inuk, (1911–1968)
 Russell Spears, Narragansett (1917–2009)
 Roxanne Swentzell, Santa Clara Pueblo (born 1962)
 Ralph W. Sturges, Mohegan (1918–2007)
 Joe Talirunili, Inuk, Canada, (c. 1893–1976)
 Nalenik Temela, Inuk, (1939–2003)
 John Tiktak, Inuk, (1916–1981)
 Francisco Tito Yupanqui (1550–1616), sculptor
 Bernadette Iguptark Tongelik, Inuk, (1931–1980)
 Simon Tookoome, Utkusiksalingmiut Inuk, (1934–2010)
 Mark Tungilik, Inuk, (?–1986)
 Natar Ungalaaq, Inuk, (born 1959)
 Marie Watt, Seneca Nation (born 1967)
 Holly Wilson (Delaware Nation/Cherokee, born 1968)t

Textile artists

 Malaya Akulukjuk, Inuk (1915–1995)
 Natalie Ball, Klamath/Modoc (born 1980)
 D.Y. Begay, Navajo (born 1953)
 Florence Davidson, Haida, Canada (1896–1993)
 Sarah Hardisty, Dene regalia maker, textile artist, and quillwork artist (1924–2014)
 Hastiin Klah, Navajo (1867–1937)
 Lily Hope, Tlingit (born 1983)
 Ursala Hudson, Tlingit
 Carla Hemlock, Mohawk (born 1961)
 Arnulfo Mendoza, Zapotec (1954–2014)
 Ardina Moore, Quapaw/Osage (1930–2022)
 Dora Old Elk, Apsáalooke/Sioux (born 1977)
 Jessie Oonark, Inuk (1906–1985)
 Eric-Paul Riege, Navajo (born 1994)
 Clarissa Rizal, Tlingit (1956–2016)
 Clara Sherman (Nezbah), Navajo (born 1911)
 Debra Sparrow, Musqueam weaver and jeweler
 Jennie Thlunaut, Tlingit (1892–1986)

Woodcarvers

 Frederick Alexcee, Tsimshian, (1853–1940s)
 Dempsey Bob, Tahltan-Tlingit, (born 1948)
 Dale Campbell, Tahltan, (born 1954)
 Jesse Cornplanter, Seneca Nation, (1889–1957)
 Amanda Crowe, Eastern Band Cherokee, (1928–2004)
 Reg Davidson, Haida, (born 1954)
 Robert Davidson, Haida, (born 1946)
 Freda Diesing, Haida, (1925–2002)
 Charles Edenshaw, Haida, (c. 1839–1920)
 Walter Harris, Gitksan, (born 1931)
 Bill Helin, Tsimshian
 Babe Hemlock, Mohawk, (born 1961)
 Calvin Hunt, Kwakwaka'wakw, (born 1956)
 Henry Hunt, Kwakwaka'wakw, (born 1923)
 Richard Hunt, Kwakwaka'wakw, (born 1951)
 Tony Hunt, Kwakwaka'wakw, (born 1942)
 Oswald Hussein, Lokono Arawak, (born 1946)
 William Jeffrey, Tsimshian, (1899–?)
 Gerry Marks, Haida
 Mungo Martin, Kwakwaka'wakw, (1879–1962)
 Tom Mauchahty-Ware, Kiowa-Comanche
 Ellen Neel, Kwakwaka'wakw, (1916–1966)
 Bill Reid, Haida, (1920–1998)
 Norman Tait, Nisga'a, (born 1941)
 Willie Seaweed, Kwakwaka'wakw
 Terry Starr, Tsimshian, Canada, (born 1951)
 Nathaniel P. Wilkerson, Gitksan, (born 1972)
James Schoppert, Tlingit, (1947–1992)

See also

 Native American art
 Timeline of Native American art history
 List of Greenlandic artists
 List of Latin American artists
 List of Native American artists
 List of Native American artists from Oklahoma
 List of writers from peoples indigenous to the Americas
 Native American women in the arts
 Notable Aboriginal people of Canada
 Institute of American Indian Arts

References

 
artists
Indigenous artists of the Americas